Mövenpick Hotels & Resorts is a Swiss hotel management company headquartered in Baar, Switzerland. It is fully owned by AccorHotels since the September 2018 acquisition from former shareholders Mövenpick Holding (66.7%) and the Saudi-based Kingdom Group (33.3%). It operates over 80 properties, including hotels, resorts and Nile cruisers, with another 30 resorts planned or under construction across the Middle East and Asia.

The hotel chain serves 5.8 million people per year.

Olivier Chavy took up the position of CEO in September 2016.

Mövenpick Group 
Mövenpick Hotels & Resorts traces its roots back to the privately owned Mövenpick Group, which was founded by the late Ueli Prager in 1948 when he opened his first restaurant in Zurich. The name was apparently inspired by the feeding action of a gull (in German, a Möwe) and how its simple movements reflected the restaurant’s theme of food served as quickly as possible.

Mövenpick Hotels & Resorts 
The official launch of Mövenpick Hotels & Resorts was marked by the opening of two hotels at Zurich Airport and Zurich-Regensdorf. Expansion beyond Europe started in 1976 with the opening in Cairo of the Mövenpick Hotel Jolie Ville. Mövenpick Hotels & Resorts were among the first companies to operate hotels under management contracts, which helped allow rapid growth. Expansion continued through the 1980s into Egypt, with the chain’s first cruise ship (HS Radamis) beginning operations in 1991.

Alwaleed bought 27 percent of the chain in 1997, increasing that to 33 percent in 2003.

New expansions into Africa and the Middle East saw “pilgrim hotels” opened in Madinah in Saudi Arabia, and a period of hotel renovation and portfolio consolidation began. Rapid expansion continued through the early 2000s. In 2003, Mövenpick was named the “fastest growing hotel chain in the Middle East” by The World Travel Market.

A strategic partnership with Green Globe was announced in 2010, beginning a drive towards sustainability with a specific focus on the travel and tourism industry across all Mövenpick Hotels & Resorts properties.

Certification and awards accompany further expansion into India, the Philippines, Singapore, and Ghana (2011). New hotels opened in China in 2013, and Pakistan in 2014, and Bangladesh in 2015.

As of 2015, Mövenpick Hotels & Resorts has 56 properties that are Green Globe certified: the highest number of certifications currently attained by any one hotel company.

In January 2014, Mövenpick took over the Sheraton Karachi for a fifteen-year period. On October 8, 2015, Mövenpick announced its second property in Pakistan, after a contract to take over The Centaurus Hotel by early 2018.

Failed expansion 
Toronto-based company Richtree Inc. attempted to introduce Mövenpick to the American market, but lost $14.9 million in the 1999–2000 financial year. Of this amount, they paid $9.9 million in broken lease fees and restructuring costs. The fees were in relation to changed plans for establishing restaurants in New York and San Diego. Richtree sued Mövenpick Holding AG.

Acquisition by AccorHotels 
AccorHotels announced in April 2018 that it signed an agreement with Mövenpick Holding and the Kingdom Holding to acquire the hotel group for CHF 560 million (EUR 482 million). The acquisition was completed in September 2018.

See also

References

External links

 

Hospitality companies of Switzerland
Swiss brands
Hotel chains in Switzerland
2018 mergers and acquisitions
Accor
Swiss companies established in 1973